Behind Enemy Lines is an American 1997 action film starring Thomas Ian Griffith, Chris Mulkey, Mark Carlton, and Spanky Manikan.

Plot 
A Vietnamese military officer, General Nguy is purchasing nuclear triggers from the Chinese triads at the border. A two-man special operations US Marine Team thwarts the transaction and obtains the triggers. However, one of the Marines, Jones, is unavoidably left behind. Mike Weston thinks Jones is dead, but when he learns otherwise from Colonel Wolfe, he goes back for him. Once in Vietnam, he is picked up and General Nguy tries to get his nuclear triggers back. Weston almost escapes, but is eventually subdued and taken to prison so General Nguy can persuade Weston to tell him the location of the nuclear triggers. News of Mike’s arrest prompts Mike Weston’s sister, Katherine "Kat" Weston and several very loyal ex-Marine buddies go to Vietnam to help get him out. Weston’s sister and friends are eventually joined by an Embassy US Marine Sergeant Blakley. Eventually, Weston and Jones from inside the prison get the other prisoners to help them escape while Kat and Mike's friends stage a rescue from the outside. They finally overwhelm the prison guards. Unfortunately, Sergeant Blakley sacrifices himself to take out an armored car before it can reinforce the prison. With the nuclear triggers regained the team all make it to the rendezvous with Colonel Wolfe – except Jones. Jones is barricaded in a guard tower machine-gunning the remaining guards in a last stand. Wolfe refuses to go back for him, but Weston will have nothing of it. Jones, about to be overwhelmed, is plucked at the last second by helicopter from the guard tower. The entire team successfully escape Vietnam. In the end, Mike, Jones, the team, and their girlfriends sail off into the sunset headed to Hawaii aboard Mike's boat.

Cast
 Thomas Ian Griffith as CIA Agent Mike Weston
 Chris Mulkey as CIA Agent 'Jonesy' Jones
 Mark Carlton as Colonel Wolfe
 Hillary Matthews as Katherine 'Kat' Weston
 Maury Sterling as Donny
 Mushond Lee as Luther
 Courtney Gains as Church
 Adam Gifford as Sergeant Blakely
 Mon Confiado as Phred
 Spanky Manikan as General Nguy
 Cris Daluz as Dr. Liu
 James Karen as TV Reporter
 Dale Gibson as 'Tex'
 Cris Aguilar as Cho
 Wilson Go as Police Chief
 Adriana Agcaoili as Chique
 Alex Cortez as Triad Boss
 Leon Miguel as Vietnamese Gangster Boss
 Don Carbonell as Police Sergeant
 Hazel Huelves as Boat Girl #1
 Kristine Witongco as Boat Girl #2

References

External links
 
 
 

1997 action films
American action films
1997 films
Orion Pictures films
Films shot in the Philippines
Films directed by Mark Griffiths (director)
1990s English-language films
1990s American films